William Francis Knatchbull (30 July 1804 – 2 May 1871), was a British Conservative politician.

Knatchbull was Member of Parliament for Somerset East between 1852 and 1865.

He died in May 1871, aged 66.

References

1804 births
1871 deaths
Conservative Party (UK) MPs for English constituencies
High Sheriffs of Somerset
UK MPs 1852–1857
UK MPs 1857–1859
UK MPs 1859–1865